The Rival Monster is a 1952 comedy novel by the British writer Compton Mackenzie. It includes characters from two earlier hit novels by Mackenzie Whisky Galore and The Monarch of the Glen.

After the Loch Ness Monster is apparently killed in a collision with a flying saucer, a new monster is spotted at the remote island of Little Todday in the Outer Hebrides, leading to tourists to flock to the area.

References

Bibliography
 David Joseph Dooley. Compton Mackenzie. Twayne Publishers, 1974.

1952 British novels
Novels by Compton Mackenzie
Novels set in Scotland
Loch Ness Monster in fiction
Chatto & Windus books